A groundscraper is a large building that has relatively few stories but which greatly extends horizontally.

Definition
MSN Encarta defines groundscraper as "a large low or medium-rise building, typically containing offices, that spreads horizontally and occupies a large amount of land".

Examples
5 Broadgate, a groundscaper owned by Swiss bank UBS, is the largest office building in the City of London.
Horizontal Skyscraper – Vanke Center in Shenzhen is as large as the Empire State Building, but is laid out horizontally and 5 stories above ground level. A park occupies the space below.
The Pentagon - the world's largest office building
Apple Park
The Squaire
Domino's Farms Office Park
Colossus of Prora, originally 4.5 km (2.8 mi) in length.
Estonian National Museum

See also
Skyscraper
List of largest buildings

References

Buildings and structures by type